The men's 3000 metres steeplechase event at the 2019 African Games was held on 26 August in Rabat.

Results

References

3000
African Games